Aplectoides is a genus of moths of the family Noctuidae.

Species
 Aplectoides condita (Guenée, 1852)

References
 Aplectoides at Markku Savela's Lepidoptera and Some Other Life Forms
 Natural History Museum Lepidoptera genus database

Noctuinae